The Clear Lake AVA is an American Viticultural Area located in Lake County, California. 
Half of the area contained within the boundaries of the AVA is Clear Lake, the largest body of freshwater in the state of California, and the namesake for the county.  The moderating influence of the lake on the surrounding area results in a climate with less diurnal variation in temperature than surrounding areas.  Elevations range from 1,300 feet to well over 3,000 feet. Clear Lake AVA is one of the coolest climates in California, which has led to success with grape varietals like Sauvignon blanc.

References

American Viticultural Areas
American Viticultural Areas of California
Geography of Lake County, California
1984 establishments in California